Braine-l'Alleud (in Dutch : Eigenbrakel) is a railway station in the municipality of Braine-l'Alleud operated by SNCB/NMBS. The station is located on the line number 124, from Brussels-South to Charleroi-South, located in the municipality of Braine-l'Alleud in the province of Walloon Brabant in the Walloon Region.

It was open for service in 1874 by the Belgian administration of Railways. It is a station of the Belgian railways (SNCB/NMBS), it is served by the following types of trains: InterCity (IC), S Train (S) and Peak hour trains (P).

Train services
The station is served by the following services:

Intercity services (IC-05 (4500 - 4549) Charleroi - Nivelles - Brussels - Mechelen - Antwerp
Intercity services (IC-07 (2000 - 2049) Charleroi - Nivelles - Brussels - Mechelen - Antwerp
Intercity services (IC-27 (4000 - 4049) Charleroi - Nivelles - Braine-l'Alleud - Brussels-Luxembourg - Brussels-Schuman - Bordet - Brussels Airport
Brussels RER services (S1) Antwerp - Mechelen - Brussels - Waterloo - Nivelles
Brussels RER services (S1) Brussels-North - Brussels-Central Brussels-South - Waterloo - Nivelles (weekends)
Brussels RER services (S9) (Landen -) Leuven - Brussels-Schuman - Brussels-Luxembourg - Braine-l'Alleud (weekdays only)

References
The Brussels RER services (S9) is running its full service since Monday 4 April 2016 the delay was due to delayed works on the Schuman-Josaphat tunnel, full service was expected April 2016.

An updated map can be found on the Belgian railways (SNCB/NMBS) website

Railway stations in Belgium
Railway stations in Walloon Brabant